Greenwich (pronounced ) is an unincorporated community in Sedgwick County, Kansas, United States.  As of the 2020 census, the population of the community and nearby areas was 64.  It is located northeast of 53rd St North and Greenwich Rd.

History
Greenwich had its start by the building of the St. Louis, Fort Scott & Wichita Railroad through that territory.

The first post office in Greenwich was established in September 1874.

Geography

Climate
The climate in this area is characterized by hot, humid summers and generally mild to cool winters.  According to the Köppen Climate Classification system, Greenwich has a humid subtropical climate, abbreviated "Cfa" on climate maps.

Demographics

For statistical purposes, the United States Census Bureau has defined this community as a census-designated place (CDP).

Education
The community is served by Circle USD 375 public school district.

References

Further reading

External links
 Sedgwick County maps: Current, Historic, KDOT

Unincorporated communities in Sedgwick County, Kansas
Unincorporated communities in Kansas